Cheriyamundam is a census town of Tirur Taluk in Kerala, India. It covers an area of 11.95 km2 and includes 25,760 (1991) inhabitants. It lies near the Tirur River.
www.cheriyamundam.com

Tourist attractions
A number of old mosques and temples are there in this panchayat. Iringavur Juma masjid, Vaniyannur Juma masjid, Choppante Mantakm temple, are some of the ancient religious centres. An ancient British bungalow is also located here.

History
Most of the land in this area was earlier under Kozhikode Samuthiri and Thrikkandyur Devaswam. After the passing of land reform act by Kerala government in 1956, land was distributed to tenants.

Transportation
Cheriyamundam village connects to other parts of India through Tirur town.  National highway No.66 passes through Tirur and the northern stretch connects to Goa and Mumbai.  The southern stretch connects to Cochin and Trivandrum.   Highway No.966 goes to Palakkad and Coimbatore.   The nearest airport is at Kozhikode.  The nearest major railway station is at Tirur.

References

Tirur area
Cities and towns in Malappuram district